John Boot (1815 – 30 May 1860) was the founder of Boots the Chemists. Originally working in agriculture, he was forced by ill health to change careers and set up a shop to sell medicinal herbal remedies at Goose Gate, Nottingham. Although he had no formal qualification, he had learned the skills from his mother and from the Methodist book, Primitive Physic by John Wesley. 

When Boot died in 1860, his wife Mary took over the business, and his son, Jesse, went on to expand the business by opening more stores in poor areas, eventually expanding it into the company Boots UK.

Biography

Early life
Boot was born in Radcliffe-on-Trent in 1815. His mother had practised the duty of herbal management; John was inspired by this.

Founding Boots

Originally a farm worker, he was forced to change career due to poor health. He set up a shop at Goose Gate, Nottingham, to sell medicinal herbal remedies, and called it "British and American Botanic Establishment".

In the store, he offered remedies and consultations to members of the public three days a week, in a poor area of Nottingham. The career had also appealed to Boot due to his Methodist roots, where he had studied the books of John Wesley, including Primitive Physic, a book about the fundamentals of herbal biology and remedies.

Personal life

Boot married Mary Mills, and the couple had one child, Jesse, on 2 June 1850.

Death

Boot's health did not improve and he died on 30 May 1860, leaving his wife and business behind. Mary Boot carried on with the business, renaming it as M & J Boot, Herbalists. Boot's son, Jesse, would help bring the business to a much larger custom base, by opening further shops in other poor areas of the city, and eventually evolving into the national Boots UK empire.

References

1815 births
1860 deaths
British retail company founders
English pharmacists
English chemists
People from Radcliffe-on-Trent
19th-century English businesspeople